The Hudson Seaway was a major seaway of North America during the Cretaceous Period some 75 million years ago. It is named after the Hudson Bay, which currently occupies much of its extent.  Although not as extensive as the Western Interior Seaway, which divided North America into eastern and western landmasses (Appalachia and Laramidia, respectively), the Hudson Seaway had major impacts on climate and migration routes by dividing the eastern half of the continent into two (Appalachia and Hudsonia). Greenland was more permanently separated, by the foundered rift that created the Labrador Seaway.

See also

References
 Charles Schuchert, 1909. "Paleogeography of North America" Bulletin of the Geological Society of America, Volume 20, 1909, ppg. 472–473. Including plate 49. 
 Willis, 1907. Bulletin of the Geological Society of America, Volume 18, 1907, pg. 393.

History of Nunavut
Historical oceans
Cretaceous paleogeography